Pierre-Ludovic Duclos and Artem Sitak defeated Sadik Kadir and Purav Raja 7–6(4), 7–6(5) in the final.

Seeds

Draw

Draw

References
 Doubles Draw

Beijing International Challenger - Doubles
2010 Men's Doubles